Doi Chiang Dao, also known as Doi Luang Chiang Dao,  is a  high mountain in Chiang Dao District of Chiang Mai Province, Thailand. It is one of the highest peaks of the Daen Lao Range on the Thai side of the border.

This mountain is part of Chiang Dao Wildlife Sanctuary, south of Pha Daeng National Park.

Doi Chiang Dao is one of the most visited birdwatching sites in Thailand with over 300 species of birds, including rare species such as the giant nuthatch and Hume's pheasant.

In 2021, UNESCO declared Doi Chiang Dao to be biosphere reserve, counted as the fifth site in Thailand (after Sakaerat, Hauy Tak Teak, Mae Sa-Kog Ma, Ranong).

See also
Chiang Dao Wildlife Sanctuary
List of mountains in Thailand

References

External links
thaibirding.com on Doi Chiang Dao

Mountains of Thailand
Daen Lao Range
Geography of Chiang Mai province
Two-thousanders of Asia